Star Box is a compilation album by X Japan, released on January 30, 1999. This compilation is very similar to B.O.X ~Best of X~, the only difference is that some tracks were replaced ("Desperate Angel", "Sadistic Desire") with others ("Love Replica", "Blue Blood", "Xclamation", "Miscast"), partly due to the death of Hideto Matsumoto a year back. In 2004 it was released in the United States, but this time included the video X Clips. The album reached number 4 on the Oricon chart.

Track listing 
 
 "Joker" (1992 Live)
 "Blue Blood"
 "Endless Rain"
 "Miscast"
 "Celebration"
 "Love Replica"
 "Xclamation"
 "Week End" (1992 Live)
 "Silent Jealousy"
 "X" (1992 Live)
 "Say Anything"

References 

X Japan compilation albums
1999 compilation albums